Corporation Tax Act may refer to 

 Corporation Tax Act 2009, an Act of the Parliament of the United Kingdom
 Corporation Tax Act 2010, an Act of the Parliament of the United Kingdom